Laurel Mountain Ski Resort is a ski resort located in Westmoreland County, Pennsylvania,  United States.  The resort is the primary attraction of Laurel Mountain State Park.

Once known as the Ski Capital of Pennsylvania, Laurel Mountain has several distinctive features, along with a storied history. Not only does Laurel Mountain boast the highest vertical drop on the Laurel Ridge in Pennsylvania at 800 feet, the mountain is famous for its double diamond Lower Wildcat Slope, one of the steepest in the state which averages near 60% grade and reaches 72% at its steepest point.

History
Laurel Mountain’s distinct character is the result of a rich history. The slopes were originally designed by European skiing legend Johann "Hannes" Schneider, the renowned Austrian ski guide and inventor of the Arlberg Method, the basis of modern alpine ski technique. The resort opened in 1940, just before the U.S. entered World War II, and some of the original structures, including the storied Midway Cabin, still stand on the property. Once an exclusive club for the most prestigious residents of Pennsylvania, Laurel Mountain was gifted to the commonwealth in 1964 and is now a winter playground for everyone.

The resort closed for more than a decade, starting in 2005. Laurel Mountain reopened for the 2016-2017 season after an extensive multi-year renovation project to upgrade the facility through a partnership between the Pennsylvania DCNR and Seven Springs Mountain Resort. A modern SkyTrac fixed-grip quad chairlift was installed in the summer of 2016, capable of transporting 2,400 skiers per hour. The snowmaking system was overhauled with the addition of 52 new guns and the water storage capacity nearly doubled to 26 million gallons. Several improvements were also made to the slopes including regrading and widening select areas to improve traffic flow.

Midway Cabin
The original lodge at Laurel Mountain built in 1940 is located approximately halfway down the Broadway slope.  Starting in 1954 the Pittsburgh Ski Club used the cabin as their mountain headquarters.  The lodge had a dormitory that was available to members for an affordable $1.65/night.  The PSC used the lodge until approximately 1954 when the region's focus on skiing shifted towards Seven Springs and Hidden Valley.

The lodge is still standing today.

Lower Wildcat
Lower Wildcat is the resort's double diamond slope.  It is the steepest ski slope in Southwestern Pennsylvania reaching a 72% grade and is considered by many to be comparable to runs found at New England resorts.

Ski lifts
Laurel Mountain has a modern SkyTrac fixed-grip quad chairlift, constructed in 2016, and one surface lift.

Sources
Laurel Mountain Official Website

References

External links
Laurel Mountain Ski Patrol
Resort Profile: Laurel Mountain

Buildings and structures in Westmoreland County, Pennsylvania